The Chenchus are a Dravidian tribe, a designated Scheduled Tribe in the Indian states of Andhra Pradesh, Telangana, Karnataka  and Odisha. They are an aboriginal tribe whose traditional way of  life been based on hunting and gathering. The Chenchus speak the Chenchu language, a member of the Dravidian language family. In general, the Chenchu relationship to non-tribal people has been largely symbiotic. Some Chenchus have continued to specialize in collecting forest products for sale to non-tribal people. Many Chenchus live in the sparse and deciduous Nallamala forest of Telangana.
 
The Chenchus are referred to as one of the Primitive Tribal Groups that are still dependent on forests and do not cultivate land but hunt for a living. Non-tribe people living among them rent land from the Chenchus and pay a portion of the harvest. Other people also settled among them with the help of the Chenchus and learned agriculture from them, and the nomadic Banjara herders who graze their cattle in the forest also have been allotted land there. The Chenchus have responded unenthusiastically to government efforts to induce them to take up agriculture themselves.

See also
Christoph von Fürer-Haimendorf
Chenchu Lakshmi, 1958 Telugu film

References
Fürer-Haimendorf, Christoph von (1943) The Chenchus: A Jungle Folk of the Deccan. London: MacMillan and Co.
Betageri, Prahlad (1993) Adavichenchara Samskruti. Bangalore: Karnataka Sahitya Academy. (in Kannada)

Footnotes

External links

CEPCE India
Chenchu Empowerment Programme
 
 The Chenchus A photo essay
A Night With the Tribals
This article includes material from the public domain Library of Congress Country Study on India.

Telugu society
Dravidian peoples
Hunter-gatherers of Asia
Scheduled Tribes of Andhra Pradesh
Scheduled Tribes of Telangana
Scheduled Tribes of Odisha
Scheduled Tribes of Karnataka
Social groups of Telangana